The 2024 UEFA Europa League Final will be the final match of the 2023–24 UEFA Europa League, the 53rd season of Europe's secondary club football tournament organised by UEFA, and the 15th season since it was renamed from the UEFA Cup to the UEFA Europa League. The match will be played at Aviva Stadium in Dublin Republic of Ireland, on 22 May 2024.

The winners will earn the right to play against the winners of the 2023–24 UEFA Champions League in the 2024 UEFA Super Cup.

Venue

Host selection
On 16 July 2021, the UEFA Executive Committee announced that due to the withdrawal of hosting rights for UEFA Euro 2020, the Aviva Stadium in Dublin was given hosting rights for the 2024 final. This was part of a settlement agreement by UEFA to recognise the efforts and financial investment made to host UEFA Euro 2020.

Match

Details
The "home" team (for administrative purposes) will be determined by an additional draw to be held after the quarter-final and semi-final draws.

See also
2024 UEFA Champions League Final
2024 UEFA Europa Conference League Final
2024 UEFA Women's Champions League Final

Notes

References

External links

2024
Final
Scheduled association football competitions
May 2024 sports events in Europe

International sports competitions in Dublin (city)
Association football in Dublin (city)
2020s in Dublin (city)
International club association football competitions hosted by the Republic of Ireland